Andraca stueningi is a moth of the family Endromidae. It is found in Vietnam.

References

Moths described in 2009
Andraca